The Arboretum du Treps is an arboretum located near Collobrières, Var, Provence-Alpes-Côte d'Azur, France.

See also 
 List of botanical gardens in France

References 
 Tourisme Var reference (French)
 Tour Magazine reference (French)

Treps, Arboretum du
Treps, Arboretum du